The men's 400 metres at the 2019 World Athletics Championships was held at the Khalifa International Stadium in Doha on 1, 2 and 4 October 2019.

Summary
Kirani James had the pedigree, a World Championship and an Olympic gold medal.  But those were back in 2011 and 2012.  He finished second behind Wayde van Niekerk's world record at the last Olympics.  van Niekerk couldn't be here because he ruined his knee in a celebrity rugby game and James was battling Graves' disease, the same ailment that affected Gail Devers.  With a faster personal best, American champion Fred Kerley had been anticipated as USA's next golden boy until Michael Norman came on the scene with a relaxed, early season personal best that only equalled the #4 time in history.  But Norman took himself out of the final, jogging home the second half of his semi-final.  The other sub-44 qualifiers were Steven Gardiner, who had run his on this track in May and Akeem Bloomfield, who was the last time qualifier to get in.  Gardiner led the qualifying, while Anthony Zambrano had to set a Colombian national record to get in.

In the final, James went out hard, passing Zambrano to his outside as they entered the backstretch.  Inside of James, Machel Cedenio, James, Gardiner and Demish Gaye were running true to the stagger.  James held that lead until midway through the final turn when he began to fade back as Gardiner was emerging slightly ahead.  Coming onto the home straight, Gardiner held a 2 metre lead over James and Kerley, with Cedenio just slightly behind them.  A further 2 metres back was Zambrano and Gaye.  Down the stretch, Gardiner widened his lead, with Kerley the next best to chase.  From far back, Zambrano was in another gear, speeding past Cedenio, James and a metre before the line, Kerley.	
	
Gardiner's big win in 43.48 is the #6 time in history.  Zambrano's 44.15 set the South American record, beating Sanderlei Parrela's record from the World Championships 20 years earlier.

Records
Before the competition records were as follows:

The following records were set at the competition:

Qualification standard
The standard to qualify automatically for entry was 45.30.

Schedule
The event schedule, in local time (UTC+3), was as follows:

Results

Heats
The first three in each heat (Q) and the next six fastest (q) qualified for the semifinal.

Semi-finals
The first two in each heat (Q) and the next two fastest (q) qualified for the final.

Final
The final was started on 4 October at 22:20.

References

400
400 metres at the World Athletics Championships